FC Codru Lozova  was a Moldovan football club based in Lozova, Moldova. The club spent two seasons in the Moldovan National Division, the first tier of Moldovan football.

History
FC Codru started in the third tier and earned promotion in the 2014–15 season, finishing second in the Centre division. In the 2018 season, they were promoted from the second tier, finishing in first place. They made their debut in the top division in the 2019 season, finishing 8th out of 8 teams. They avoided relegation after winning the relegation play-off against CSF Spartanii Selemet, but were relegated the following season. Codru were dissolved on 11 August 2021 when they merged with CS Atletic Strășeni.

Honours
Divizia A
 Winners (1): 2018

Recent seasons

References

External links
FC Codru Lozova on Soccerway.com

Defunct football clubs in Moldova
Association football clubs established in 2008
Association football clubs disestablished in 2021
2008 establishments in Moldova
2021 disestablishments in Moldova
Strășeni District